Aqbolagh-e Hasanabad (also Romanized as Āqbolāgh-e Ḩasanābād) is a village in Anguran Rural District, Anguran District, Mahneshan County, Zanjan Province, Iran. At the 2006 census, its population was 59, in 15 families.

References 

Populated places in Mahneshan County